Group A of 2022 Women's Africa Cup of Nations was played from 2 to 8 July 2022. The group was made up of host Morocco, Burkina Faso, Senegal and Uganda.

Teams

Standings

Matches

Morocco vs Burkina Faso

Senegal vs Uganda

Burkina Faso vs Senegal

Uganda vs Morocco

Morocco vs Senegal

Burkina Faso vs Uganda

Discipline

Fair play points were used as tiebreakers in the group if the overall and head-to-head records of teams were tied, or if teams had the same record in the ranking of third-placed teams. These are calculated based on yellow and red cards received in all group matches as follows:

 first yellow card: plus 1 point;
 indirect red card (second yellow card): plus 3 points;
 direct red card: plus 4 points;
 yellow card and direct red card: plus 5 points;

Goalscorers

References

External links

Group A